The canton of Reyrieux is a former administrative division in eastern France. It was disbanded following the French canton reorganisation which came into effect in March 2015. It had 22,954 inhabitants (2012).

The canton comprised 13 communes:

Ars-sur-Formans
Civrieux
Massieux
Mionnay
Misérieux
Parcieux
Rancé
Reyrieux
Saint-André-de-Corcy
Sainte-Euphémie
Saint-Jean-de-Thurigneux
Toussieux
Tramoyes

Demographics

See also
Cantons of the Ain department

References

Former cantons of Ain
2015 disestablishments in France
States and territories disestablished in 2015